James McEwan Kirk (4 November 1913 – 1963) was a Scottish footballer who played for Clyde as a right back. He won the Scottish Cup with the club in 1939 after suffering disappointment when the team fell at the semi-final stage in both 1936 and 1937. In 2018, Kirk's winner's medal reached a price of £1,600 at auction.

His career was curtailed by World War II, during which he was selected for Scotland in an unofficial international against a League of Ireland XI in April 1940.

References

1913 births
1963 deaths
Scottish footballers
Sportspeople from Wishaw
Association football fullbacks
Scottish Junior Football Association players
Blantyre Victoria F.C. players
Clyde F.C. players
Scottish Football League players
Scotland wartime international footballers
Footballers from North Lanarkshire